Instituto Abel is a 1st through 12th grade school in Niterói, Rio de Janeiro, Brazil established in 1950. The Institute follows the philosophy of Jean-Baptiste de la Salle, the French patron saint of Christian teachers.

References

External links
Official Instituto Abel website, in Portuguese

Schools in Brazil
Educational institutions established in 1950
Education in Rio de Janeiro (state)
1950 establishments in Brazil